Callumbonella is a genus of sea snails, marine gastropod mollusks in the family Trochidae, the top snails (unassigned to a subfamily).

Species
Species within the genus Callumbonella include:
 Callumbonella suturalis (Philippi, 1836)
Species brought into synonymy
 Callumbonella namibiensis Rolan, Gonzalez-Porto & de Matos-Pita, 2009: synonym of Callumbonella suturalis (Philippi, 1836)

References

 Thiele J. (1924). Revision des Systems der Trochacea. Mitteilungen aus dem Zoologischen Museum in Berlin, 11: 47-74, 1 pl.
 Gofas, S.; Le Renard, J.; Bouchet, P. (2001). Mollusca, in: Costello, M.J. et al. (Ed.) (2001). European register of marine species: a check-list of the marine species in Europe and a bibliography of guides to their identification. Collection Patrimoines Naturels, 50: pp. 180–213
 Nolf F. & Verstraeten J. (2013) Critical analysis and additional information about the identity and distribution of the genus Callumbonella (Mollusca: Gastropoda: Trochoidea) in the East Atlantic and the Mediterranean Sea. Neptunea 12(4): 1-36

 
Trochidae
Gastropod genera